CMBA refers to:

Carnegie Mellon Business Association  - see Tepper School of Business
Certified MBA, a professional certification
Classic Moth Boat Association - see Moth (dinghy)